Peter Wisgerhof (born 19 November 1979) is a Dutch former professional footballer who played as a centre-back for Vitesse, NEC and Twente.

Career

Club
Wisgerhof made his debut in professional football, being part of the Vitesse squad in the 1999–2000 season. He was allowed to sign on loan with NEC for half a year. He then signed permanently with NEC, then played nine seasons for the club until making a switch in 2009 to Twente, who had sold defender Rob Wielaert to Ajax. Wisgerhof signed a contract with Twente for three-and-a-half years. Here he has quickly played himself into the squad.

In his second season, 2009–10, Twente became Eredivisie champions. In the summer of 2010, he became captain, after Blaise Nkufo left Twente for Seattle Sounders. At the start of the 2010–11 season, he and Twente won the Johan Cruyff Shield after defeating Ajax 1–0.

In 2011, Twente came second in the 2010–11 Eredivisie, behind Ajax. Wisgerhof played a notable role in this victory as he was claimed to have made an obvious schwalbe (dive), which was much commented on in the local and international press. On 30 July 2011, Wisgerhof won his second Johan Cruyff Shield with Twente after his side again defeated Ajax, 2–1.

International
Wisgerhof made 13 appearances for the Netherlands national under-21 team, scoring one goal. On 10 October 2010, Netherlands senior team head coach Bert van Marwijk called him up (at age 30) to the squad for the 17 November match against Turkey. In the second half of the match, Wisgerhof made his debut as a substitution for the injured Joris Mathijsen.

Career statistics

Club

International

Honours

Club
Twente
Eredivisie: 2009–10
KNVB Cup: 2010–11
Johan Cruyff Shield: 2010, 2011

References

External links
 Voetbal International profile 

Living people
1979 births
People from Wageningen
Dutch footballers
Netherlands international footballers
Netherlands under-21 international footballers
Association football defenders
Eredivisie players
SBV Vitesse players
NEC Nijmegen players
FC Twente players
Jong FC Twente players
Footballers from Gelderland